Qovsi Tabrizi (born Alijan Ismailoghlu Qovsi) was a 17th century Azerbaijani poet.

Life 
Qovsi Tabrizi was born in Tabriz in the first quarter of the 17th century. His father, Ismail Qovsi was a craftsman and a poet. Tabrizi was educated in Isfahan and during his stay there, he wrote poems about Tabriz and often compared the two cities.

Poetry 
Tabrizi hated social injustice and ridiculed clergy in his works. The theme of romantic love and an idealistic and pantheistic worldview took a significant place in his lyrics. Pessimistic motifs are also present, shown in his descriptions of people's thoughts and hopes. Other features of Tabrizi's poems include a diversity of representations, forms and intonations. Qovsi Tabrizi often used literary expressions of folk language.

Collections of Tabrizi's lyrical poems are stored in two manuscripts. One is in the British Library in London and the other is in the History Museum of Georgia in Tbilisi.

References

Literature 
 
 

1568 births
Poets from Tabriz
1640 deaths
17th-century Iranian poets
Azerbaijani poets
16th-century writers of Safavid Iran
17th-century writers of Safavid Iran
16th-century Iranian poets